Matthew Ribeiro Powell (born December 11, 1996) is an American soccer player who plays as a defender.

Career

Youth, College & Amateur
Powell played with USSDA side De Anza Force, before playing college soccer at the University of California, Los Angeles in 2015. After redshirting his freshman year, Powell went on to play 72 appearances for the Bruins, scoring 6 goals and tallying 5 assists, as well as being a three-time All-Pac-12 selection. 

While at college, Powell also appeared for USL League Two side FC Golden State Force. where he made 11 appearances across three seasons for the club.

Los Angeles Force
Powell joined NISA side Los Angeles Force for their 2020 season, making 2 appearances the club during the season.

Greenville Triumph
On September 18, 2020, Powell joined USL League One side Greenville Triumph for the remainder of the season. He made his debut on October 2, 2020, appearing as a 77th-minute substitute during a 2–0 win over Orlando City B. Greenville declined Powell's contract option following their 2020 season.

References

External links
Profile at UCLA Athletics

1996 births
American soccer players
Association football defenders
FC Golden State Force players
Greenville Triumph SC players
Living people
Los Angeles Force players
National Independent Soccer Association players
People from Castro Valley, California
Soccer players from California
Sportspeople from Castro Valley, California
UCLA Bruins men's soccer players
USL League One players
USL League Two players
De Anza Force players